The Town of Gawler is a local government area located north of Adelaide city centre in South Australia containing Gawler and its suburbs. The corporate town was established in 1857 due to the township's residents' dissatisfaction at being governed by three different district councils.

The Town of Gawler is located within the officially declared boundaries of the Adelaide metropolitan area.   1.0% of the population were Indigenous Australian, and 76.3% were born in Australia.

The current mayor of Gawler is Karen Redman (elected November 2014), the first elected female mayor in the town's history. In November 2022, Redman was elected to her third term in office.

History
Local government was established in the area from 1853 with the creation of the District Council of Barossa West (covering the western half of the Hundred of Barossa). Residents of the township of Gawler, at the confluence of the North and South Para rivers, were dissatisfied with the state of local governance. The township intersects four separate cadastral divisions, being at the corners of the hundreds of Mudla Wirra, Nuriootpa, Barossa and Munno Para. As such, the east half of the township was locally governed by the Barossa West council, the western half by the District Council of Mudla Wirra and the southern outskirts by the District Council of Munno Para West. The Gawler ratepayers petitioned for their own local government, centred in Gawler, and the Corporation of the Town of Gawler was established on 9 July 1857.

Council
The current council  is:

Suburbs

 Bibaringa (5118) (part; shared with City of Playford)
 Evanston (5116)
 Evanston Gardens (5116)
 Evanston Park (5116) (part; shared with City of Playford)
 Evanston South (5116)
 Gawler (5118)
 Gawler East (5118)
 Gawler South (5118)
 Gawler West (5118)
 Hillier (5116) (part; shared with City of Playford)
 Kudla (5115)
 Reid (5118) (part; shared with Light Regional Council)
 Willaston (5118)

Waste management and recycling
Garbage, recycling, and green waste collection services are provided by the Northern Adelaide Waste Management Authority.

See also
 Gawler, South Australia
 List of Adelaide suburbs
 Local Government Areas of South Australia

References

External links
Official site
Town of Gawler's first 50 years

Gawler
Gawler
1857 establishments in Australia
Gawler, South Australia